Acacia botrydion is a shrub belonging to the genus Acacia and the subgenus Phyllodineae. It is native to the Wongan Hills in the Wheatbelt region of Western Australia.

It blooms from July to September and produces yellow flowers.

See also
List of Acacia species

References

botrydion
Acacias of Western Australia
Endemic flora of Southwest Australia
Avon Wheatbelt